Harry Potter and the Chamber of Secrets is a fantasy novel written by British author J. K. Rowling and the second novel in the Harry Potter series. The plot follows Harry's second year at Hogwarts School of Witchcraft and Wizardry, during which a series of messages on the walls of the school's corridors warn that the "Chamber of Secrets" has been opened and that the "heir of Slytherin" would kill all pupils who do not come from all-magical families. These threats are found after attacks that leave residents of the school petrified. Throughout the year, Harry and his friends Ron and Hermione investigate the attacks.

The book was published in the United Kingdom on 2 July 1998 by Bloomsbury and later in the United States on 2 June 1999 by Scholastic Inc. Although Rowling says she found it difficult to finish the book, it won high praise and awards from critics, young readers, and the book industry, although some critics thought the story was perhaps too frightening for younger children. Much like with other novels in the series, Harry Potter and the Chamber of Secrets triggered religious debates; some religious authorities have condemned its use of magical themes, whereas others have praised its emphasis on self-sacrifice and the way one's character is the result of one's choices.

Several commentators have noted that personal identity is a strong theme in the book and that it addresses issues of racism through the treatment of non-human, non-magical, and non-living people. Some commentators regard the story's diary that writes back as a warning against uncritical acceptance of information from sources whose motives and reliability cannot be checked. Institutional authority is portrayed as self-serving and incompetent.

The film adaptation of the novel, released in 2002, became (at the time) the sixth highest-grossing film ever and received generally favourable reviews. Video games loosely based on Harry Potter and the Chamber of Secrets were also released for several platforms, and most obtained favourable reviews.

Plot

While spending the summer at the Dursleys, twelve-year-old Harry Potter is visited by a house-elf named Dobby. He warns that Harry is in danger and must not return to Hogwarts. Harry refuses, so Dobby magically ruins Aunt Petunia and Uncle Vernon's dinner party. A furious Uncle Vernon locks Harry into his room in retaliation. The Ministry of Magic immediately sends a notice accusing Harry of performing underage magic and threatening dismissal from Hogwarts. 
  
Ron Weasley and his brothers, Fred and George, arrive in their father's flying Ford Anglia and rescue Harry, taking him to the Weasley home. Harry and the entire Weasley family travel to Diagon Alley for school supplies. They run into Hermione Granger and meet Lucius Malfoy, father of Harry's nemesis Draco, and also Gilderoy Lockhart, a conceited autobiographer and adventurer who is the new Defence Against the Dark Arts professor. At King's Cross station, Harry and Ron are unable to enter Platform 9¾ and miss the Hogwarts Express. They fly in Mr Weasley's car to Hogwarts, crashing into the Whomping Willow on school grounds and damaging Ron's hand-me-down wand. The car then escapes into the forest.

Harry learns that some in the wizarding community disdain Muggle-born wizards like Hermione, believing pure-bloods are superior. Harry is the only one who hears a strange voice emanating from the castle walls. Soon after, Mr Filch's cat, Mrs Norris, is found petrified, along with a bloody warning scrawled on a wall: "The Chamber of Secrets has been opened. Enemies of the heir, beware". It is believed that Salazar Slytherin, one of the school's founders, created the Chamber after a dispute with fellow founders on admitting Muggle-born students. The Chamber supposedly houses a monster that only the Heir of Slytherin can control.

During a Quidditch game, a rogue Bludger strikes Harry, breaking his arm. Lockhart blunders an attempt to repair it, sending Harry to the hospital overnight. Dobby visits Harry there, and reveals he jinxed the Bludger and sealed the portal at King's Cross. He says the Chamber of Secrets was once opened years before. After another attack, students attend a defensive duelling class, during which Harry spontaneously exhibits a rare ability to speak 'Parseltongue', the language of snakes.

Harry, Ron, and Hermione suspect Draco is the Heir, given his hostility toward Muggle-borns. Hermione secretly brews Polyjuice Potion, allowing Harry and Ron to impersonate Draco's lackeys Crabbe and Goyle. They learn that Draco knows nothing about the heir. Meanwhile, Moaning Myrtle, a ghost that haunts a girls' bathroom, shows the trio a diary left in her stall. It belonged to Tom Riddle, a student who witnessed another student's death during the Chamber's previous opening. Riddle's consciousness within the diary claims to Harry that Hagrid was responsible. Hermione is petrified in the next attack. The school is put on lockdown and may close. Headmaster Albus Dumbledore is forced out and Hagrid is sent to Azkaban prison.

Following instructions left by Hagrid, Harry and Ron follow spiders into the Forbidden Forest. They encounter a gigantic Acromantula named Aragog, which denies its involvement, and claims spiders fear the real monster. Aragog attempts to feed Harry and Ron to its progeny, but Mr Weasley's car rescues them. Harry and Ron discover that Hermione had deduced that the monster is a basilisk – a gigantic snake whose direct gaze kills and petrifies victims when seen in a reflection. Harry concludes the basilisk is the voice in the walls and that it travels through the plumbing. He also realises Moaning Myrtle was the student that was killed.

Ron's sister Ginny is abducted and taken into the Chamber. Harry and Ron discover the entrance in Myrtle's bathroom, and force Lockhart to enter it with them. Lockhart confesses that he is a fraud who made up all of his stories and attempts to erase the boys' memories after stealing Ron's damaged wand. The spell backfires, obliterating his own memory and causes a rockfall; Ron is separated from Harry and stays behind to help Lockhart.

Harry proceeds to the Chamber and finds an unconscious Ginny. A manifestation of Tom Riddle reveals that he is Lord Voldemort and the Heir of Slytherin. He previously opened the Chamber and framed Hagrid. He has been using the diary to possess and control Ginny, who had been behaving strangely. The basilisk appears to kill Harry. Dumbledore's phoenix Fawkes arrives, bringing Harry the Sorting Hat. Fawkes blinds the basilisk and Harry pulls the Sword of Godric Gryffindor from the Hat. He slays the basilisk but is poisoned by its venom. As Riddle taunts the dying Harry, Fawkes' tears heal Harry. Harry stabs Riddle's diary with a severed basilisk fang, destroying it and Riddle's body, and reviving Ginny.

Harry, Ron, Ginny, and Lockhart return to the castle. Harry gives the diary to Dumbledore, who is curious about it. Lucius Malfoy bursts in, furious that Dumbledore returned. He is accompanied by Dobby, who is the Malfoys' house-elf and was working to protect Harry. Harry realizes that Lucius slipped the diary into Ginny's cauldron when in Diagon Alley to open the Chamber. Harry tricks Lucius into freeing Dobby from servitude by giving him a sock; Lucius attempts to attack Harry in revenge, but Dobby magically deflects him.

The petrified students are cured, Gryffindor wins the House Cup again, Hagrid is released, Lockhart is confined to St. Mungo's Hospital, and Harry returns to Privet Drive in high spirits.

Publication and reception

Development
J.K Rowling found it difficult to finish Harry Potter and the Chamber of Secrets because she was afraid it would not live up to the expectations raised by Harry Potter and the Philosopher's Stone. After delivering the manuscript to Bloomsbury on schedule, she took it back for six weeks of revision.

In early drafts of the book, the ghost Nearly Headless Nick sang a self-composed song explaining his condition and the circumstances of his unknown death. This was cut because the book's editor did not care for the poem, which has been subsequently published as an extra on J. K. Rowling's official website. The family background of Dean Thomas was removed because Rowling and her publishers considered it an "unnecessary digression," and she considered Neville Longbottom's own journey of discovery "more important to the central plot."

Publication

Harry Potter and the Chamber of Secrets was published in the UK on 2 July 1998 and in the US on 2 June 1999. It immediately took first place in UK bestseller lists, displacing popular authors such as John Grisham, Tom Clancy, and Terry Pratchett and making Rowling the first author to win the British Book Awards Children's Book of the Year for two years in succession. In June 1999, it went straight to the top of three US bestseller lists, including in The New York Times.

First edition printings had several errors, which were fixed in subsequent reprints. Initially, Dumbledore said Voldemort was the last remaining ancestor of Salazar Slytherin instead of his descendant. Gilderoy Lockhart's book on werewolves is entitled Weekends with Werewolves at one point and Wanderings with Werewolves later in the book.

Critical response
Harry Potter and the Chamber of Secrets was met with near-universal acclaim. In The Times, Deborah Loudon described it as a children's book that would be "re-read into adulthood" and highlighted its "strong plots, engaging characters, excellent jokes and a moral message which flows naturally from the story". Fantasy author Charles de Lint agreed, and considered the second Harry Potter book to be just as good as Harry Potter and the Philosopher's Stone, a rare achievement among series of books. Thomas Wagner regarded the plot as very similar to that of the first book, based on searching for a secret hidden under the school. However, he enjoyed the parody of celebrities and their fans that centres round Gilderoy Lockhart, and approved of the book's handling of racism. Tammy Nezol found the book more disturbing than its predecessor, particularly in the rash behaviour of Harry and his friends after Harry withholds information from Dumbledore, and in the human-like behaviour of the mandragoras used to make a potion that cures petrification. Nevertheless, she considered the second story as enjoyable as the first.

Mary Stuart thought the final conflict with Tom Riddle in the Chamber was almost as scary as in some of Stephen King's works, and perhaps too strong for young or timid children. She commented that "there are enough surprises and imaginative details thrown in as would normally fill five lesser books." Like other reviewers, she thought the book would give pleasure to both children and adult readers. According to Philip Nel, the early reviews gave unalloyed praise while the later ones included some criticisms, although they still agreed that the book was outstanding.

Writing after all seven books had been published, Graeme Davis regarded Harry Potter and the Chamber of Secrets as the weakest of the series, and agreed that the plot structure is much the same as in Harry Potter and the Philosopher's Stone. He described Fawkes's appearance to arm Harry and then to heal him as a deus ex machina: he said that the book does not explain how Fawkes knew where to find Harry; and Fawkes's timing had to be very precise, as arriving earlier would probably have prevented the battle with the basilisk, while arriving later would have been fatal to Harry and Ginny.

Awards and honours
Rowling's Harry Potter and the Chamber of Secrets was the recipient of several awards. The American Library Association listed the novel among its 2000 Notable Children's Books,
as well as its Best Books for Young Adults. In 1999, Booklist named Harry Potter and the Chamber of Secrets as one of its Editors' Choices, and as one of its Top Ten Fantasy Novels for Youth. The Cooperative Children's Book Center made the novel a CCBC Choice of 2000 in the "Fiction for Children" category. The novel also won Children's Book of the Year British Book Award, and was shortlisted for the 1998 Guardian Children's Award and the 1998 Carnegie Award.

Harry Potter and the Chamber of Secrets won the Nestlé Smarties Book Prize 1998 Gold Medal in the 9–11 years division. Rowling also won two other Nestlé Smarties Book Prizes for Harry Potter and the Philosopher's Stone and Harry Potter and the Prisoner of Azkaban. The Scottish Arts Council awarded their first ever Children’s Book Award to the novel in 1999, and it was also awarded Whitaker's Platinum Book Award in 2001. In 2003, the novel was listed at number 23 on the BBC's survey The Big Read.

Main themes
Harry Potter and the Chamber of Secrets continues to examine what makes a person who he or she is, which began in the first book. As well as maintaining that Harry's identity is shaped by his decisions rather than any aspect of his birth, Harry Potter and the Chamber of Secrets provides contrasting characters who try to conceal their true personalities: as Tammy Nezol puts it, Gilderoy Lockhart "lacks any real identity" because he is nothing more than a charming liar. Riddle also complicates Harry's struggle to understand himself by pointing out the similarities between the two: "both half-bloods, orphans raised by Muggles, probably the only two Parselmouths to come to Hogwarts since the great Slytherin."

Opposition to class, death and its impacts, experiencing adolescence, sacrifice, love, friendship, loyalty, prejudice, and racism are constant themes of the series. In Harry Potter and the Chamber of Secrets Harry's consideration and respect for others extends to the lowly, non-human Dobby and the ghost Nearly Headless Nick. According to Marguerite Krause, achievements in the novel depend more on ingenuity and hard work than on natural talents.

Edward Duffy, associate professor at Marquette University, says that one of the central characters of Chamber of Secrets is Tom Riddle's enchanted diary, which takes control of Ginny Weasley – just as Riddle planned. Duffy suggests Rowling intended this as a warning against passively consuming information from sources that have their own agendas. Although Bronwyn Williams and Amy Zenger regard the diary as more like an instant messaging or chat room system, they agree about the dangers of relying too much on the written word, which can camouflage the author, and they highlight a comical example, Lockhart's self-promoting books.

Immorality and the portrayal of authority as negative are significant themes in the novel. Marguerite Krause states there are few absolute moral rules in Harry Potter's world, for example Harry prefers to tell the truth, but lies whenever he considers it necessary – very like his enemy Draco Malfoy. At the end of Harry Potter and the Chamber of Secrets, Dumbledore retracts his promise to punish Harry, Ron, and Hermione if they break any more school rules – after Professor McGonagall estimates they have broken over 100 – and lavishly rewards them for ending the threat from the Chamber of Secrets. Krause further states that authority figures and political institutions receive little respect from Rowling. William MacNeil of Griffith University, Queensland, Australia states that the Minister for Magic is presented as a mediocrity. In his article "Harry Potter and the Secular City", Ken Jacobson suggests the Ministry as a whole is portrayed as a tangle of bureaucratic empires, saying that "Ministry officials busy themselves with minutiae (e.g. standardising cauldron thicknesses) and coin politically correct euphemisms like 'non-magical community' (for Muggles) and 'memory modification' (for magical brainwashing)."

This novel implies it begins in 1992: the cake for Nearly-Headless Nick's 500th deathday party bears the words "Sir Nicholas De Mimsy Porpington died 31 October 1492".

Connection to Harry Potter and the Half-Blood Prince
Chamber of Secrets has many links with the sixth book of the series, Harry Potter and the Half-Blood Prince. In fact, Half-Blood Prince was the working title of Chamber of Secrets and Rowling says she originally intended to present some "crucial pieces of information" in the second book, but ultimately felt "this information's proper home was book six". Some objects that play significant roles in Half-Blood Prince first appear in Chamber of Secrets: the Hand of Glory and the opal necklace that are on sale in Borgin and Burkes; a Vanishing Cabinet in Hogwarts that is damaged by Peeves the Poltergeist; and Tom Riddle's diary, which is later revealed to be a Horcrux. Additionally, these two novels are the ones with the most focus on Harry's relationship with Ginny Weasley.

Adaptations

Film

The film version of Harry Potter and the Chamber of Secrets was released in 2002. Chris Columbus directed the film, and the screenplay was written by Steve Kloves. It became the third film to exceed $600 million in international box office sales, preceded by Titanic, released in 1997, and Harry Potter and the Philosopher's Stone, released in 2001. The film was nominated for a Saturn Award for the Best Fantasy Film, According to Metacritic, the film version of Harry Potter and the Chamber of Secrets received "generally favourable reviews" with an average score of 63%, and another aggregator, Rotten Tomatoes, gave it a score of 82%.

Video games

Five unique video games by different developers were released between 2002 and 2003 by Electronic Arts, loosely based on the book:

References

External links

1998 British novels
1998 fantasy novels
1998 children's books
Bloomsbury Publishing books
British novels adapted into films
Flying cars in fiction
Fiction about memory erasure and alteration
Fiction about shapeshifting
Fiction set in 1992
Fiction set in 1993
02
Scholastic Corporation books
Sequel novels
Children's fantasy novels